Arkady Arkadyevich Babchenko (born 18 March 1977) is a Russian print and television journalist. From 1995, Babchenko served in the communication corps in the North Caucasus while participating in the First Chechen War. He later volunteered for six months during the Second Chechen War. After leaving the army in 2000 he worked as a war correspondent for more than a decade. Since 2017 he has worked as a presenter for the (Kyiv based) TV channel ATR. In 2006 he published the book One Soldier's War, about his experiences in Chechnya.

It was reported on 29 May 2018 that Babchenko had been shot dead in his home in Kyiv, Ukraine. The next day, he appeared in person at a press conference with the Security Service of Ukraine (SBU). The SBU said it staged Babchenko's murder in order to arrest Ukrainian assassins (allegedly recruited by Russian security services operatives) who were actually planning on carrying out the assassination.

Early life
Babchenko was born in 1977 in Moscow, Russian SFSR, USSR. One of his grandfathers was born in Henichesk, Ukrainian SSR. His maternal grandmother is Jewish.

In 1995, while studying law in Moscow aged 18, Babchenko was conscripted into the Russian army and served until 2000 in the North Caucasus. He served in the communication corps in the First Chechen War and later volunteered for six months during the Second Chechen War.

In June 2022, Facebook banned Babchenko's account, with Babchenko saying in a post that he believed his strong reaction to Russian shelling of a mall in Ukraine led to the ban.

Journalism and author
After leaving the armed forces in 2000, Babchenko worked as a war correspondent for more than a decade, including for Moskovskij Komsomolets and Zabytyi Polk.

Between 2002/2003 and 2006, the literary magazine Novy Mir published Babchenko's account of his experiences as a soldier in Chechnya, in a series of chapters titled "Ten Episodes About the War". Novy Mir also published his short story "Alkhan-Yurt" (named after the Alkhan-Yurt massacre). "Ten Episodes About the War" was published in book form by Eksmo in 2006 as Alkhan-Yurt. It was translated and published in English as One Soldier's War.

Legal issues
In March 2012, in an act of political persecution, a criminal case was initiated in Russia against Babchenko for "making public calls for mass riots" because of the publication of a post about the possible tactics of For Fair Elections movement protesters.

Ukraine
In December 2016 Babchenko wrote on Facebook that he had "no sympathy, no pity" for members of the Alexandrov Ensemble choir and pro-government journalists who died in the 2016 Tu-154 plane crash near Sochi en route to Syria. Speaking to Radio Free Europe/Radio Liberty'''s Russian Service, Babchenko said that "we must be in one line; we must express sadness; we must appear sad -- and anyone who doesn't must be destroyed." In a piece published by The Guardian on 24 February 2017, Babchenko claimed that in this Facebook post: "I did not call for anything or insult anyone. I just reminded my readers that Russia was indiscriminately bombing Aleppo, without recognising that dozens of children were dying in those bombs, their photographs making their way around the world." In the backlash, his home address was revealed to the public, he then received personal threats and some people called for him to be stripped of his Russian citizenship. Babchenko and his family fled Russia in February 2017, moving first to Prague. He subsequently moved to Kyiv with his family and started working as a presenter for the Kyiv-based Crimean TV channel ATR. In April 2019 he said that he was permanently banned from Facebook.

Staged death
International media reported on 29 May 2018 that Babchenko was assassinated as he returned to his apartment in Kyiv. In a press statement, the Kyiv Police stated that Babchenko possibly could have been killed as a reprisal for his work as a journalist. Prime Minister of Ukraine Volodymyr Groysman claimed Russia was responsible for the assassination. The head of Russia's Federal Security Service, Alexander Bortnikov, denied the involvement of Russia.

The next day, Babchenko appeared alive and well on live Ukrainian television at a press conference held by the Security Service of Ukraine (SBU). Babchenko had collaborated with the SBU for a month, conducting a secret operation. According to the SBU, the murder had been staged to expose Russian agents. Previously in Kyiv, vocal critics of Vladimir Putin, journalist Pavel Sheremet and politician Denis Voronenkov, had been assassinated in 2016.Russian journalist and Kremlin critic Arkady Babchenko shot dead in Kiev, The Guardian (29 May 2018) Babchenko's wife said she knew her husband's death would be staged. The SBU also said it had detained a Ukrainian suspect (allegedly recruited by a Russian intelligence official), and an accomplice, who was engaged in preparations for the contract killing of Babchenko.Organizer of Babchenko 'murder' detained in Kyiv, Interfax-Ukraine (30 May 2018) The alleged assassin was reported to be helping the SBU with its investigation. According to SBU head Vasyl Hrytsak, those who had wanted to assassinate Babchenko had been planning to kill 30 people in Ukraine. The SBU claimed to have discovered this plot when one of the men approached to kill Babchenko revealed the plot to the security services. Allegedly several people, including Ukrainian war veterans, had been offered for the contract killing.

The Organization for Security and Co-operation in Europe (OSCE), the International Federation of Journalists and Reporters Without Borders criticised the Ukrainian authorities for the staged death of Babchenko. Babchenko and the Ukrainian authorities defended the operation, saying it was necessary to collect evidence. Ukrainian President Petro Poroshenko (also) rejected criticism of the sting operation, claiming that because of it "The whole world saw the real face of our enemy. It is not Ukraine you should condemn but Russia."

On 31 May a Ukrainian court had remanded Borys Herman in custody for allegedly having paid to a hired hitman after the news of the "killing" broke. Herman said that he had had no intention of killing the reporter and that he had co-operated with the Ukrainian counterintelligence. (In turn, the prosecutor stated that Herman was not a "secret agent" at all.) Borys Herman is a businessman working for a Ukrainian-German weapons company and he is a son of Lev Herman, known for his deep-rooted ties to a famous Russian criminal authority of Ukrainian origin, Semion Mogilevich, who has many alleged links to top Russian officials. Herman mentioned Vyacheslav Pivovarnik as a direct contractor of the assassination. Pivovarnik is the Ukrainian citizen, who according to some sources cooperated with the former deputy of the State Duma Sergey Shishkarev. His location was not established; there was evidence that in February he left in an unknown direction. The trial in the case of the attempt on Babchenko was held behind closed doors. Boris German pleaded guilty and made a plea bargain, and on August 30, 2018, the Holosiivskyi District Court of Kyiv sentenced Herman to 4.5 years in prison. However, this was revealed to the public only two days later, by the head of the SBU Vasyl Hrytsak. The verdict came into force 30 days later, but the text of the judgment was not made public at that time. German's lawyer refused to comment on the verdict, as well as on the existence of a plea bargain. In November 2019, Herman was released, having served 1.5 years in prison.

Self-imposed exile
Early November 2019 Babchenko relocated to Israel as a response to the election of Volodymyr Zelensky as President of Ukraine in April 2019. However, other journalists in Ukraine have indicated he moved to "either Estonia or Finland." After a period of vociferously insisting on Israel as his country of residence, Babchenko has employed a "no comment" policy regarding his permanent location. Nonetheless, he vows to return to Ukraine in the future claiming "Ukraine is my country. And I'm going to live there."

Personal life
Babchenko is married. He has six adopted children and a biological daughter.

Publications
AuthoredAlkhan-Yurt: Povesti i Rasskaz. Moscow: Yauza, 2006. . (In Russian)One Soldier's War in Chechnya. London: Portobello, 2007. . London: Portobello, 2008. . Translated by Nick Allen. (In English)One Soldier's War. New York: Grove, 2008. . Reprint edition; New York: Grove, 2009. . Translated by Nick Allen. (In English)La Guerra Más Cruel. Barcelona: Galaxia Gutenberg: Círculo de Lectores, 2008. . Translated by Joaquín Fernández-Valdés Roig-Gironella. (In Spanish)Dziesięć Kawałków o Wojnie: Rosjanin w Czeczenii. Seria Terra incognita (Warsaw, Poland). Warszawa: Wydaw. W.A.B., 2009. . (In Polish)La Guerra di un Soldato in Cecenia. Strade blu. Milano: Mondadori, 2011. . Translated by Maria Elena Murdaca. (In Italian)Voĭna = Tlom. Moscow: ANF, 2016. . (In Russian)How Free is the Russian Media? = Naskolʹko Svobodny Smi v Rossii?. Index on Censorship, vol. 37, no. 1. London: Routledge, 2008. .

ContributedWar & Peace: Contemporary Russian Prose. Glas New Russian Writing 40. Moscow: Glas, 2006. Edited by Natasha Perova and Joanne Turnbull. Includes Argun by Babchenko. . An anthology. Translated from Russian.

Awards
2001 Debut Prize from the International Pokolenie (Generation) Foundation for Десять серий о войне (Ten Episodes About the War)''
2018 Time Person of the Year as part of "The Guardians"

Notes

References

External links
 

1977 births
Living people
Russian people of Ukrainian descent
Russian journalists
Writers from Moscow
ATR (TV channel) people
Russian emigrants to Ukraine
People of the Euromaidan
People who faked their own death
Jewish journalists
Russian Jews